Chandi (Chinese: 曾理) is a sub-district municipality (Thesaban Tambon) in Chawang District of Nakhon Si Thammarat Province, southern Thailand in the middle of the Malay Peninsula.

It situates on the district border of Chang Klang, Na Bon and Thung Yai District. A unique feature of this town is "China Town of Nakhon Si Thammarat" which was founded by  Chinese migrants of Hokchew origins around 100 years ago.

Chandi is the most important for Chawang district economically, as the center of commercial hub and transportation link to the neighboring districts and provinces. Also, Chandi is the Para Rubber Central Market in Nakhon Si Thammarat province.

Geography and Layout
Chandi locates on the main canal bank of "Khlong Chandi", which flows to the north-west before merging with the Tapi River in Chawang area. The geographic of Chandi Town area is mainly on plain along Chandi Town while the rest is on hill which is good for agriculture. 
Neighboring sub-districts are (from the north clockwise) Saira, La-Ai, Suankhan, Changklang, Lakchang and Chawang.
Chandi Town's layout was planned by Ling Ka Chueng, who held most of the land in the Chandi area. He planned the layout into the square and center by the main road.

Demographics
Population: approximately 7,500 people (September 2017)
Temporary residents: Approximately 3,000 people
Religious: Buddhism 90%, Christianity 9.5%, others 0.5%
Race: Thai Chinese 85%, (Native) Thai 14% and others 1%
Languages: Foochow 65%, Thai (national and official), Hokkien and Teochew 15%
Literacy rate: 99%
Occupations: Service sector, merchant retailing and farmers

Administration

Chandi had been stated as "Chandi Sub-district Division" until the announcement of cancellation of "sub-district division" system and changed all sub-district divisions to be a "Municipality" instead since 24 May 1999. 
Chandi municipality comprised 6.5 km2. and then in 2007, the Ministry of Interior annulled "Chandi Sub-district Administrative" and united with Chandi Municipality. Now, the totally area of Chandi Municipality has been covered all the sub-district with 33.23 km2.
Chandi City Municipality will be administered by 'Major' who won the election vote. The mayor will be on the position up to 4 years by having 2 mayor assistants.

List of mayors of Chandi Municipality
Chanvijan Kiattivudhinont (2014–present)
Samphan  Leungvoraphan (2006–2013)
Chanvijan Kiattivudhinont (1999–2006)

History
100 years ago, there was the first group of Fuzhou Chinese immigrants came to and chose to live in the area where was not far from the canal. The settlers discovered that the land was much better suited for rubber plantations and the enrichment of nature resources in this area. So they persuade other groups of Chinese who was being in other provinces and in China came to settle down in this area. So, the Chinese community in Chandi had been bigger and became one of commercial center of district due to the nature of Chinese who really good at trading. At first, there wasn't a name to call this area but mostly Thai call here as "Jeendee" because the generosity of Chinese who lived in this area had been very well known. But there was another small village (Close to Nabon district), named "Chandi". So, there were many persons getting confused and called "Jeendee village" as "Chandi". This name has been confused for long time till people call "Jeendee" as "Chandi" until now.

Chandi grew from a small settlement with rubber tapping and latex processing as the main economic activity. The town was flanked by various Chinese settlements comprising mostly descendants of immigrants from the Kutien district (古田县) of neighbouring Ningde city, Fujian, China. The rapid development of the urban settlements saw the plantation and estate areas developed and converted into residential and commercial areas.

Chinese population facts
Chinese school: There is one Chinese school in Chandi, namely "Jaroenwittaya School" (振华学校). Established since 1937 by a few Chinese immigrants, now the school is administrated by the Chandi Educational Foundation. Actually, there was another one school which was organized by the same foundation, henceforth it was combined with Jaroenwittaya School since 2005. 
Chinese shrines: There are 2 Chinese shrines for traditional religious worship.
Prominent surnames: Khajornsuwan, Jiratthikul, Tangsatjatham and Tanvaravuttikul.

Internal immigrant diaspora population centres
Thailand: Bangkok, Lamae and Map Ammarit (Chumphon), Ban Chandi (Rayong)

Economics
From 1930 to 1990, rubber was the sole commercial crop cultivated by the farmers. The economic well-being of the population invariably fluctuated in tandem with the prices of rubber. In the early 1980s, the lack of agriculture area in Chandi made the migration of many farming families to new settlements and lastly the diversification of cultivation to include other commercial crops, the most important of which is the planting of oil palms. In the early 1990s, it led to a significant development: the emigration of the younger populace to Bangkok, to seek a better living.

Chandi has become one of transportation center in Chawang district because there are many highway passing by Chandi and also there are many trains stopping at Chandi train station. Therefore, the accessibility to connect other districts and provinces has centered in Chandi particularly.

In terms of the importance of commercial center, Chandi becomes the center of banking, trading, office, para rubber market and transportation since 1980. The cash flow in Chandi market was estimated around 50 million baht daily and it got high possibility to getting higher continuously due to the number of investment in this area.

In 2008, the international hyper market brand "Tesco Lotus" interested in investment in Chandi area due to the location potential and rate purchasing power in the area. Unfortunately, this project was suspended by Chandi protestors who believed that the arriving of hyper market would destroy the way of local life and commercial system in the area.

Transportations
Train: Khlong Chandi train station is situated in the center of Chandi town, close to highway number 4195. This train station is categorized as "train station level 1" Khlong Chandi train station is one of the most important train station in Nakhon Si Thammarat province because the passengers are able to get off this station and takes a bus or other kinds of transportation to nearby districts and provinces.

Public Transport:
Bus: Bansong - Nakhon Si Thammarat, Suratthani - Nakhon Si Thammarat, Krabi - Nakhon Si Thammarat, Phuket - Nakhon Si Thammarat, Bangkok - Nakhon Si Thammarat
Mini bus: Chandi - Thungyai, Chandi - Nakhon Si Thammarat, Chandi - Phipun, Chandi - Thungsong
Van: Bansong - Nakhon Si Thammarat, Krabi - Nakhon Si Thammarat, Phuket - Nakhon Si Thammarat, Tham Phannara - Chandi - Hatyai

Festival
Chinese New Year:
Traditional Chinese New Year Basketball Competition:
Basketball is the most favorite sport for Chinese in Chandi town, especially for the teenagers. Chandi Traditional Chinese New Year Basketball Competition has been held together with Chinese New Year Celebration Festival for more than 20 years. Not only the local but also Thailand National Team attend this competition annually which supported by Chandi people and government give the honor cup to the winner.

Cuisine
There are many well-known Chandi specialities, namely Hokkien Fried Noodles, White Noodles with red bouillon chicken, Traditional Noodle/Wunton Soup. There are also many traditional sweets and desserts which are made by the Fuzhou Chinese community. Chandi is famous for a Chinese biscuit known as "Kong Pian" or kompia.

Attractions
Floating Market Project
Ancient Shell Cemetery
Phratat Noi Temple (In Changklang district area)

Notable people

Bo Than Khlai Vajasidha is the well-known monk who is respected not only for local but also nationwide including former prime minister Somchai Wongsawat. Bo Than Khlai Vajasidha was an abbot of Suankhan Temple. He was a vital monk who entitled as a great developer of Nakhon Si Thammarat. He built many temples in many places such as in Chawang, Nabon, Phipoon in Nakhon Si Thammarat, also in Phrasaeng, Ban Nasan district in Suratthani.
Furthermore, he was denoted himself for society, he was a leader to build the local roads in Chandi to connect with other districts as well as built the bridges in other areas.
Ling Ka Cheong (also known as Lim Ka Chueng) had contributed to the town of Chandi in many ways and the town of Chandi had bestowed on him a great honour and in his memory, they had named the Main Road after him, it is now called Ling Ka Cheong Road.

External links
https://web.archive.org/web/20140225212426/http://www.chandeecity.go.th/ Chan Di Municipality

Populated places in Nakhon Si Thammarat province